Foster Bastios (born 20 February 1975) is a Ghanaian retired footballer who played as a defender.

He played for Ebusua Dwarfs from 1994 to 1996, then Liberty Professionals F.C. before joining Kalamata F.C. in Greece in the 1996–97 season. He played there through the 1997–98 season, then returned to Liberty Professionals where he played until 2002. He was also capped for Ghana, and was a squad member in the 1997 Korea Cup and the 1998 Africa Cup of Nations.

References

1975 births
Living people
Ghanaian footballers
Ebusua Dwarfs players
Liberty Professionals F.C. players
Kalamata F.C. players
Expatriate footballers in Greece
Ghanaian expatriate footballers
Ghanaian expatriate sportspeople in Greece
Ghana international footballers
Association football defenders